Hollis may refer to:

Hollis (singer)
Hollis (name)

Places
 Hollis, Alaska
 Hollis, Kansas
 Hollis, Maine
 Hollis, Missouri
 Hollis, New Hampshire
 Hollis, Oklahoma
 Hollis, Queens, neighborhood in New York
Hollis (LIRR station), its Long Island Railroad station

See also
 HOLLIS, acronym for Harvard Library's online catalog
 Holi or Holli, Hindu festival, plural: "Hollis"